Silverlake Lounge is a music venue in Silver Lake, Los Angeles.

Located in the heart of Los Angeles's Silver Lake neighborhood, at the corner of Sunset Boulevard and Silver Lake, Silverlake Lounge is one of the most storied venues in the area. The bar, originally noted for its drag and burlesque shows (which continue to this day) and divey atmosphere, gained notoriety in the early 2000s, as one of the central hubs for the neighborhood's blossoming arts scene. Silver Lake became the cynosure of the LA music scene after Rilo Kiley's first album, and Silverlake Lounge was the home to many of the era's most well recognized acts, thanks to booking company The Fold. Of all the Silver Lake music venues that existed during this early period, Silverlake Lounge remains the longest standing (although Spaceland, just down the street, did close, remodel and rebrand itself The Satellite and continues to showcase local music to this day).

The band Silversun Pickups famously took their name from the liquor store across the street from Silverlake Lounge. Black Rebel Motorcycle Club played there regularly (often with bands such as Brian Jonestown Massacre and The Warlocks), including a three night weekend stint, just before they were signed to their record contract. Later, bands such as Local Natives, Lord Huron, King Washington, Nacosta, and Silver Snakes played weekly Monday night residencies at the venue.

Silverlake Lounge was often the setting for wild antics and other happenings that have become part of local folklore. Booker Scott Sterling once threatened Black Lips that he would "kick their amps in if they pissed on the stage. They did, and I did." Just before a show by Metric, the club installed a new subwoofer system without time to adequately test it. When the band began playing, the excessive bass knocked the liquor bottles off the shelf behind the bar. The lounge was known for its dark, low stage and its "Salvation" sign, first used for a show by hardcore band 400 Blows. LA band The Movies once were so upset with Sterling that they threatened to smash the sign to bits, but they were prevented in doing so. When Sterling left Silverlake Lounge, he took the iconic Salvation sign with him; it has been replaced by a new, arched sign reading "Silverlake".

Notable Performers

 Silversun Pickups
 Black Rebel Motorcycle Club
 Elliott Smith
 Metric
 Local Natives 
 Cold War Kids
 Icebird
 Tame Impala
 Ty Segall & The Muggers  
 Wye Oak
 Lord Huron
 The Warlocks
 The Mowglis
 ...And You Will Know Us by the Trail of Dead 
 Cairo Knife Fight 
 Dengue Fever
 Grouplove
 Pepper Rabbit
 Devendra Banhart
 Black Lips
 King Washington
 Girls
 Those Darlins
 Futurebirds
 Wovenhand
 Avi Buffalo
 Madi Diaz
 Vanessa Silberman
 rabbit snare
 The Nocturnes
 Glasser
 The Head 
 The Breeders
 El Ten Eleven

References

External links
 
http://buzzbands.la/2012/05/04/salvation-takes-its-leave-of-silver-lake-while-the-silverlake-lounge-goes-on-without-bookers-the-fold/
http://www.laweekly.com/music/last-night-futurebirds-and-lord-huron-at-silverlake-lounge-2409913

Music venues in Los Angeles